Stuart Mitchell is a Scottish musician.

Stuart Mitchell may also refer to:
Stuart Mitchell (American football)